Spellbinder (also known as Waving Hands) is a simultaneous 1977 pencil-and-paper game invented by Richard Bartle and first published in his fanzine, Sauce of the Nile.  It has since been re-created in a variety of formats, including software for the X Window System, play-by-email, Java applet, Android application, and web-based.

Gameplay
Two or more players take the role of wizards, and the object of the game is to be the last wizard standing. Wizards can cast spells at other wizards, themselves, or summoned monsters. These spells are cast through gestures: each turn, the player chooses two gestures, one for each hand, from clap (C), wave (W), snap (S), wriggle fingers (F), proffered palm (P) and digit point (D). There are also the non-magical gestures stab (>) and nothing (-). Turns are resolved simultaneously once all wizards have submitted their gestures for a given turn.

These gestures are built up via many turns to form spells. For instance, one can cast the spell "Magic Missile" by performing the S (snap) gesture followed by the D (digit point) with the same hand on a consecutive turn. This is usually denoted as 'SD'. The spell is cast on the turn that the D is made, assuming no intervention (such as a Counter Spell). Play centers around the strategy of tracking what spells are being cast on all four (or more) hands, thus ensuring your spells achieve their desired effect while attempting to mitigate those of your opponent.

The game is one of pure strategy; outside of the "Confusion" spell which causes a random gesture to be made all spell effects can be anticipated deterministically, making it akin to Chess or Go. Through a few minor variants to the rules, all random chance and other imbalances can be removed.

Strategy
While there are many aspects to Spellbinder strategy, Bluffing is a key element to all game play, often referred to as "Shadow Casting". In this common practice, warlocks play a set of gestures, which form the beginning of a spell, without ever completing it. When this happens opponents are left with the choice to either defend against a spell which may not be cast at all, or risk not defending against it. For example, 'PSD' forms the beginning of a 'Charm Person' spell 'PSDF', but one may also continue this set to a '..DPP' which forms an 'Amnesia', without ever completing the Charm.

Much like in Chess, the resolution of the game opening plays an important part in the later development of the game.
Common openings such as 'D/P', 'S/P', 'S/W' have been studied in depth.

Rock Paper Scissors
Spellbinder may be regarded as an advanced variation of Rock paper scissors, a popular hand game often played between 2 players.

This variation includes two main differences. First, the game allows for eight different gestures vs. the original three.
Second, in Spellbinder there is a meaning to a sequence of gestures, and not only to individual gestures.

References 

 Spellbinder history including links to playing online.
 Rules as written by Andrew Buchanan.
 Spellbinder Combo Assistant (250Kb) a freeware program written in Delphi that help to calculate the best spell combinations for next turns. It contains a spell list and descriptions in English, Spanish and Italian. (Screenshot).
 Warlocks a fully developed free-to-play web interpretation by Raven Black. Includes ladder, melee (3+ player duels) and Elo ranking system, challenge board, and optional rule variants.
 Warlocks for Android Android application to access to games.ravenblack.net site
 The Refuge Forum a forum for discussions of game strategy and tactics
 Facebook Community Spellbinder Facebook Community

External links 
 Freeware software helper with game rules in 3 languages

Hand games
Multiplayer online games
Paper-and-pencil games
Pascal (programming language) software
Rock paper scissors